"Play My Music" is a song by the American pop rock band Jonas Brothers. The song was released as the band's second single from the soundtrack album Camp Rock. This song is also featured in the DVD release of Disney's Have a Laugh! Volume 4 in Re-Micks musical short segment.

Critical reception
Neil Genzlinger from The New York Times said that the song is the highlight of the movie and "showing the verve and stage presence the other performers lack". Bob Smithouser from The Pluggedin said the song is one of the album's best along with "Start the Party", also saying that "We Rock" and "Play My Music" encourage people to follow their dreams. Kate Richardson from Idolator was positive and commented that the song "really shine".

Live performances
The band performed the song at Cambio special from MTV on June 25, 2010. They also sang the song at Walmart Soundcheck, released on November 2 the same year. The song was included in their live album Jonas Brothers: The 3D Concert Experience, released on February 27, 2009.

Charts

References

2008 singles
2008 songs
Jonas Brothers songs
Camp Rock
Songs about music
Walt Disney Records singles
Songs written by Kara DioGuardi
Songs written by Mitch Allan